Lutheran Hospital  may refer to:

Lutheran Hospital, a part of the Cleveland Clinic in Cleveland, Ohio
Lutheran Hospital of Indiana, in Fort Wayne, Indiana
Lutheran Hospital of Maryland, a former use of the Hebrew Orphan Asylum in Baltimore, Maryland
Advocate Lutheran General Hospital, in Park Ridge, Illinois

See also
Lutheran Medical Center (disambiguation)